The WWE Championship is a professional wrestling world heavyweight championship in WWE, currently on the Raw brand. It was the first world title established in WWE, having been introduced in 1963 as the World Wide Wrestling Federation (WWWF) World Heavyweight Championship. The promotion was renamed World Wrestling Federation (WWF) in 1979 and ended its affiliation with the National Wrestling Alliance (NWA) in 1983, with the title also renamed to reflect the changes. In 2001, it was unified with the World Championship (formerly the WCW World Heavyweight Championship) following the WWF's buyout of World Championship Wrestling (WCW) and became the Undisputed WWF Championship. In 2002, the WWF was renamed World Wrestling Entertainment (WWE) and split its roster into two brands, Raw and SmackDown. The title, now renamed the WWE Championship, was then designated to the SmackDown brand while WWE established an alternate world title known as the World Heavyweight Championship for the Raw brand. A third alternate world title, the ECW World Heavyweight Championship, was reactivated for the ECW brand in 2006. It was vacated and decommissioned when the ECW brand disbanded in 2010.

When WWE Champion Randy Orton defeated World Heavyweight Champion John Cena at the TLC: Tables, Ladders & Chairs pay-per-view event on December 15, 2013, the World Heavyweight Championship was unified with the WWE Championship, resulting in the retiring of the former, as well as the renaming of the latter to the WWE World Heavyweight Championship. On June 27, 2016, the name was shortened back to the WWE Championship, before assuming the WWE World Championship name on July 26, when the brand extension returned. It became designated to the SmackDown brand and WWE again established an alternate world title known as the WWE Universal Championship for the Raw brand. In December 2016, WWE again shortened the title's name back to WWE Championship. Following the events of Crown Jewel 2019, the Universal and WWE Championships switched brands.

The championship is generally contested in professional wrestling matches, in which participants execute scripted finishes rather than contend in direct competition. Some reigns were held by champions using a ring name while others use their real name. Roman Reigns is the current champion in his fourth reign. He won the title by defeating previous champion Brock Lesnar in a Winner Takes All match to unify the WWE Championship and Universal Championship, which Reigns defended, on April 3 2022, at WrestleMania 38 in the Dallas-Fort Worth metroplex city of Arlington, Texas. Despite it being billed as a unification match, both titles remain independently active with Reigns being called the Undisputed WWE Universal Champion.

The first champion was Buddy Rogers, who won the championship in 1963. The champion with the single longest reign is Bruno Sammartino with a reign of 2,803 days while the record for longest combined reign is also held by Sammartino at 4,040. John Cena has the most reigns with 13. Eight men in history have held the championship for a continuous reign of one year (365 days) or more: Bruno Sammartino (who achieved the feat on two occasions), Pedro Morales, Bob Backlund, Hulk Hogan, Randy Savage, John Cena, CM Punk, and AJ Styles.

Title history

Names

Reigns   

Combined reigns 

See also
 World championships in WWE

References

External links 
 WWE Championship history at WWE.com
 WWE Championship history at Wrestling-Titles.com

WWE championships lists